Elachista compsa is a moth of the family Elachistidae. It is found from Fennoscandia and the Baltic region to Germany, Poland to Italy.

The larvae feed on Deschampsia cespitosa and Melica nutans uniflora. They mine the leaves of their host plant. The mine starts as a narrow gallery that ascends from the lower third of the leaf up to the leaf tip, where it reverses direction. After changing direction, the mine widens and finally takes up the full width of the leaf. The mine it is filled with a string of frass grains. Pupation takes place outside of the mine. Larvae can be found from October to December. They then overwinter within the mine. In spring, they vacate the mine to pupate. There is a second generation in July. The larvae are yellow at first and bone coloured later. They have a light brown head.

References

compsa
Moths described in 1974
Moths of Europe